Manhuaçu is a municipality in Eastern Minas Gerais state, in Brazil. Its population was 91,169 (2020) and its area is 628 km2.

Location

Located 260 km from the state capital of Belo Horizonte, it is near the important road junction of BR 262 (Belo Horizonte-Vitória) and  BR 116 (Rio-Bahia).  The total area of the municipality is 629 km2 and it lies at an elevation of 635 m in the foothills of the Serra da Chabata or Caparaó, which form the boundary between the states of Minas Gerais and Espírito Santo.
The main rivers are the Ribeirão do Manhuaçuzinho and the Manhuaçu River, which are tributaries of the Doce River.

Annual rainfall averages .

The municipality holds part of the Sossego Forest Biological Station.

Economy
The economy of the city is based on the production and processing of mountain coffee. It is the center of commercialization of coffee of the Zona da Mata, and there are offices and warehouses of the main exporting and processing companies of the country.  There are storage facilities for about one million sacks of coffee. The region harvests about 1.5 million sacks of coffee a year

There are three schools of higher education, Faculdade do Futuro , Doctum  and Facig - Faculdade de Ciências Gerenciais de Manhuaçu .

Parque Nacional do Caparaó
The Caparaó National Park is a national park administered by the Brazilian Institute of Environment and Renewable Natural Resources (IBAMA) and is located approximately 60 km southeast of Manhuaçu on the boundary dividing the states of Minas Gerais and Espírito Santo.  The entrance to the park is at Alto Caparaó.  The area of the park is 318 square kilometers.

It was created in 1961 by President Jânio Quadros.  It contains the third highest peak in the country, the Pico da Bandeira  (2,891 m). In 1859 Emperor Dom Pedro II had ordered that a flag of the Empire be placed on the highest peak of the Serra do Caparaó. It is believed that the name Pico da Bandeira is due to this fact.  The mountains of the Caparaó chain have landscapes of great beauty with numerous waterfalls and caverns. There are also other important peaks like Pico do Cristal (2769.7 m) and Pico do Calçado (2.766 m).

References

External links
Portal Manhuaçu (in Portuguese)
A site about Manhuaçu (in Portuguese)
Lessons of the High Caparaó (in English)

Municipalities in Minas Gerais